The Mycale Strait, also known as the Samos Strait, is a narrow strait separating the island of Samos from Anatolia (Turkey) in the eastern Aegean Sea. At its narrowest point it is only 1.6 km wide; the narrowest between any Aegean island and Turkey. It is named after the nearby Mount Mycale on the Turkish mainland. The Dilek Peninsula-Büyük Menderes Delta National Park, located in the Kuşadası district of Aydın Province, is situated along the strait.

Straits of Greece
Straits of Turkey
Aegean Sea
Landforms of Aydın Province
Landforms of Samos
Landforms of the North Aegean